Florencio "Butch" Barsana Abad (born July 13, 1954) is a Filipino lawyer and politician. Having held many cabinet-level ranks in the past, he was appointed by President Benigno Aquino III as Secretary of the Philippine Department of Budget and Management. Abad held various cabinet-level positions in the past, particularly as Secretary of the Department of Education and Secretary of the Department of Agrarian Reform.

Early life
Abad was born on July 13, 1954, in Sampaloc, Manila to a political family based in Batanes province. His parents were the late Jorge Abad, five-time Liberal Congressman and Secretary of the Department of Public Works, Transportation and Communications during the administration of the late President Diosdado Macapagal, and Aurora Abad, former governor and congresswoman of Batanes.

Educational background
He spent his elementary years at Lourdes School Quezon City. He finished his high school and Bachelor of Science in business management and Bachelor of Laws at the Ateneo de Manila University. He passed the Bar Examination in 1985. He completed his studies with Masters in Public Administration at the John F. Kennedy School of Government in Harvard University in Cambridge, Massachusetts as a student of the Edward Mason Program in Public Policy and Management.

Career

Early career and entry to politics
Abad had been a trade unionist of the Federation of Free Workers and Ateneo Workers College from 1976 to 1979 and was research director of Ateneo Center for Social Policy and Public Affairs. When the Congress of the Philippines was restored in 1987, Abad launched his successful congressional bid to represent the Lone District of Batanes where he became a staunch advocate of agrarian reform in the national legislature. He held the position until his appointment to his brief stint as Secretary of the Department of Agrarian Reform and ran again for Congress in 1995, completing his third and final term in 2004.

National politics
In July 2004, then President Gloria Macapagal Arroyo appointed Abad as Secretary of the Department of Education. The removal of "culture" and "sports" from the Department of Education, Culture and Sports (DECS) was his proposal, in line with the thinking that the Department's focus should solely be on basic education. To streamline operations, he championed the institutionalization of three agencies for the different educational levels: DepEd for elementary and secondary education, the Commission on Higher Education (CHED) for tertiary education, and the Technology Education and Skills Development Authority (TESDA) for technical and vocational education.

Amid calls for the resignation of Arroyo due to her links to the Hello Garci scandal in 2004, Abad resigned his post and became a critic of the former president. He served as the campaign manager of the Liberal Party in the 2010 presidential elections, where the party standard-bearer Benigno Aquino III, then a senator, won the race. Aquino appointed him Budget Secretary when the former assumed the presidency on June 30, 2010.

Personal life
Abad is married to former Ateneo School of Government director and Batanes Rep. Henedina Razon-Abad and is father to four: Presidential Management Staff (PMS) chief Sec. Julia Abad, Pio Emmanuel Abad, Luis Andres Abad, and Cecilia Paz Abad. He is the brother of internationally acclaimed visual artist Pacita Abad, who died in 2004. Abad lost his wife on October 8, 2017, when she died of cancer at the age of 62.

References

|-

|-

|-

|-

1954 births
Living people
Ateneo de Manila University alumni
People from Sampaloc, Manila
Secretaries of Budget and Management of the Philippines
Benigno Aquino III administration cabinet members
Members of the House of Representatives of the Philippines from Batanes
Secretaries of Education of the Philippines
Secretaries of Agrarian Reform of the Philippines
Harvard Kennedy School alumni
Politicians from Batanes
Arroyo administration cabinet members
Filipino expatriates in the United States
Corazon Aquino administration cabinet members
Presidents of the Liberal Party of the Philippines